"Mother Mary" is a song by the American rock band Foxboro Hot Tubs from their 2008 album Stop Drop and Roll!!! The single peaked at #16 on the Billboard Hot Modern Rock Tracks chart.

Track listing
45rpm Vinyl

Side A
"Mother Mary" - 2:46
Side B
"She's a Saint Not a Celebrity" - 2:57

References

External links

2008 singles
2008 songs
Songs written by Billie Joe Armstrong
Songs written by Mike Dirnt
Songs written by Tré Cool